Mahdi Afri (born 1 January 1996) is a visually impaired Moroccan Paralympic athlete competing in T12-classification sprinting events. He represented Morocco at the 2016 Summer Paralympics held in Rio de Janeiro, Brazil and he won two medals: the silver medal in the men's 400 metres T12 event and the bronze medal in the men's 200 metres T12 event.

At the 2017 Islamic Solidarity Games in Baku, Azerbaijan, he won two medals: the gold medal in the men's 400 metres T12 event and the bronze medal in the 100 metres T12 event.

At the 2017 World Championships he won the gold medal in both the men's 200 metres T12 and men's 400 metres T12 events. Two years later, at the 2019 World Championships, he won the silver medal in the men's 400 metres T12 event.

References

External links 
 

Living people
1996 births
Place of birth missing (living people)
Paralympic athletes of Morocco
Paralympic athletes with a vision impairment
Athletes (track and field) at the 2016 Summer Paralympics
Athletes (track and field) at the 2020 Summer Paralympics
Medalists at the 2016 Summer Paralympics
Paralympic silver medalists for Morocco
Paralympic bronze medalists for Morocco
Paralympic medalists in athletics (track and field)
Moroccan male sprinters